Narva Town Hall is a historic municipal building in the city of Narva, Estonia. The building is located on Town Hall Square (Raekoja plats) next to the Narva College of the University of Tartu.

History
The town hall was one of the few elements of the city's baroque-era architecture to be rebuilt following the Second World War. It is now surrounded largely by Soviet-era Stalinist designs and Khrushchyovka. In 2021 a €7 million renovation project at the Narva Town Hall started. The building will return to its original function as the seat of Narva's city government and will also accommodate a tourist information centre and restaurant.

Functions
On display inside is a model of the historic city. The building is not currently the location of meetings of the Narva municipality, which meets in a building on Peetri Square.

See also
 Tartu Town Hall

References

City and town halls in Estonia
Buildings and structures in Narva
Baroque palaces in Estonia